Mount Castelvecchio is a mountain in Italy. It is located near Montecoronaro and is part of the Apennine Mountains. The source of the Savio River is on this mountain at an elevation of 1,126 meters.

References

Mountains of the Apennines
Mountains of Emilia-Romagna